Bartolommeo Scaligero (born c. 1605) was an Italian painter of the Baroque. He was born in Padua, and trained with Alessandro Varotari, and was active in Venice. He painted for the church of Corpus Domini in Venice. His niece, Lucia Scaligero, was also a painter.

References

17th-century Italian painters
Italian male painters
Italian Baroque painters
Painters from Venice
Painters from Padua
1600s births
Year of death unknown